The Sierra Nevada National Park (PNSN) is an important National Park of Venezuela located between Mérida and Barinas states in the west of the country. It was created on May 2, 1952, by decree of President Germán Suárez Flamerich, in order to protect the Sierra Nevada de Mérida in the Andes.

It was the second national park decreed, after Henri Pittier National Park, which became the first Venezuelan national park 15 years earlier.

The Sierra Nevada is an area of great ecological importance for Venezuela, for preservation of the ecosystem of the tallest in the country, where mountain ranges are located at higher altitudes of the Venezuelan Andes, including the Pico Bolívar, the highest geographical in Venezuela with 4,978 m.

History

The initiative to create the Sierra Nevada Park was born in the Escuela de Ingeniería Forestal since 1948. The proposal takes strength and the University of the Andes, appoints a commission to the preliminary study, later, was presented to national authorities to justify the creation of the park.

On May 2, 1952, the Governing Board chaired by Germán Suárez Flamerich, signed a decree which stated the Sierra Nevada as National Park.

The Sierra Nevada Park is the second oldest National Park in Venezuela, after Henri Pittier National Park.

Initially the park covered an area of 190,000 ha. However, the August 14, 1985 by decree of the National Executive, President Jaime Lusinchi are added other 86,446 ha., leaving a total area of 276,446 ha.

Geography

The park encompasses parts of six municipalities of the states of Mérida and three of the Barinas state. Its total area is 276,446 hectares, of which 185,886 hectares belong to the state of Mérida, which means 67.2% of the total area, while the remaining 90,560 ha represent the state of Barinas, 32.8% of the area of the park.

The Sierra Nevada covers one of the two branches of the Cordillera de Mérida in the central Andes of Venezuela, which is the same name Sierra Nevada, the area of it is rugged highlighting the location of the main peaks in the country as these are Pico Bolívar (4,978 m), Pico Humboldt (4,942 m), Pico La Concha (4922), Pico Bonpland (4883), Pico Espejo (4880), Pico León (4740), Pico El Toro (4729) and Pico Mucuñuque (4609).

The Sierra Nevada is separated from the Sierra La Culata,  other Cordilleran massif of Andean mountain range, by depression of the Chama River in the north, while the northeast makes the valley of the River Santo Domingo, from the Kettle Mucubají to the dam José Antonio Páez. In the southwest, the boundary of the park forms the valley of River Nuestra Señora, left bank tributary of the Chama River, downstream from the city of Ejido.

The park is in two major mountain ranges: the Sierra Nevada de Mérida and the Sierra de Santo Domingo, which are characterized by high peaks, glacial valleys and river valleys.

Most rivers are the Chama, Albarregas and Mucujún flowing into Lake Maracaibo. Meanwhile, the Orinoco basin, the main ones are the Caparo, the Santo Domingo and the Cajurí that flows into the Uribante. In the park are also thirteen watersheds, and ten lakes of glacial origin, that global warming effects have been reduced, some of them are: Mucubají, La Negra, La Verde and Los Anteojos.

The vegetation of the park is representative of the Andean cloud forests, mostly trees and undergrowth layers well developed and numerous epiphytes and endemic species. The higher altitudes, above 3,000 m is developed typical moorland vegetation, consisting of a large number of species of Espeletia. It also presents a xerophytic scrub vegetation in the drier areas of the River Basin Nuestra Señora. In Barinas, the vegetation is predominantly forest, with trees up to 25 m. height.

Climate
The Sierra Nevada has two annual periods, a period of maximum rainfall concentrated between May and October and a dry period or minimum rainfall between December and March. In addition to the precipitation as rain, is also very common in snow precipitation or snowfall in the highest peaks, snowfalls are frequent between July and September and sporadic the rest of the year.

Due to its location in a mountain range, the temperature range in the park is quite large, varying its annual average between 26 °C in the lower areas (400 m) and -05 °C in the highest peaks (+ 4900 masl).

Fauna

For the type of weather that gives the park, it has developed into one of the largest shelter and space for hundreds of animal species. One of the largest species can be found in the park is the spectacled bear, besides being the only representative of the family Ursidae in the Andes, is one of the endangered species.

Among other species of wildlife living in the Sierra Nevada are: the white-tailed deer, the helmeted curassow, the puma, the Andean coati, the Andean leopard, the jaguar, the paca and the rabbit of the moor, among others. Feral cattle and horses can be found in the area.

Among the birds in the park includes the Andean guan, the white-tailed quetzal, the masked trogon, magpies and black-chested buzzard-eagle, some larger species like the Andean condor are now in danger of extinction and is therefore is taking a restocking program in Colombia.

Access

The most popular access to the park is via the Mérida cable car. Another important input is by road through the village of Tabay, for the area of La Mucuy, entering the Park Sierra Nevada making a trip through the lagoons Coromoto, La Verde, El Suero, bordering the picos Humboldt, La Concha, the area basis for up to Pico Bolívar by the south, and reaching the Pico Espejo back south-east.

Gallery

See also

Sierra Nevada de Mérida

References

 
National parks of Venezuela
Geography of Mérida (state)
Geography of Barinas (state)
Páramos
Protected areas established in 1952
1952 establishments in Venezuela
Tourist attractions in Mérida (state)